Tyrosine-protein phosphatase non-receptor type 23 is an enzyme that in humans is encoded by the PTPN23 gene.

References

Further reading

External links